Juliana is a feminine given name. It may also refer to:

Places
 Juliana Canal, Netherlands
 Juliana Peak, a former name of Puncak Mandala, a mountain in Papua, Indonesia
 Juliana Republic, a short-lived state in the Brazilian province of Santa Catarina in 1839

People
 Anicia Juliana (462–527/528), daughter of the Western Roman Emperor Olybrius, one of the first non-reigning female art patrons in recorded history
 Juliana of the Netherlands (1909-2004), queen of the Netherlands from 1948 until her abdication in 1980
 Dhita Juliana (born 1993), Indonesian beach volleyball player
 Jurrick Juliana (born 1984), Dutch Curaçaoan footballer

Arts, entertainment, and media

Fictional characters
 Juliana Crain, a main character in the TV series The Man in the High Castle
 Lady Juliana, a fictional character in the 1998 cartoon movie Quest for Camelot

Literature
 Juliana (film), a 1988 Peruvian film
 Juliana (poem), one of four signed poems ascribed to Anglo-Saxon poet Cynewulf
 Juliana, or The Princess of Poland, a play by John Crowne

Brands and enterprises
 Juliana's, a Japanese 1990s discotheque
 Juliana's Pizza, a pizzeria in Brooklyn, New York

Other uses
 , several ships
 Juliana '31, a football club from Malden, Netherlands